The terms barrier ridge,<ref
 name=ribbon></ref> a term of art<ref
 name=Lawson></ref> in the earth sciences, especially geology and sometimes barrier range (more common as a geography term) describing the existence of gross landforms describing long ridgelines which are particularly difficult to pass, especially in the context of being on foot or dependent upon other forms of animal powered transportation systems, in mountainous and sometimes hilly terrains.

Barrier ridges such as the steep rising slopes or escarpments of the Allegheny Front, separating the ridge-and-valley Appalachians from the drainage divides of the uplands of the Appalachian Plateau. The ridge and valley region is filled with a succession of nearly impassible ridges from Southern Georgia, along the Appalachian chain all the way to Maine.

Notes

References

External links

Geography terminology
Landscape
Landforms